The Way We Were also known as 16 Summers, is a 2014 Taiwanese romance drama produced by Ruby Lin and Lisa Tan and directed by Fu-Hsiang Hsu (許富翔). It stars Lin, Weber Yang, Ann Hsu, Melvin Sia and Jason Tsou (鄒承恩) as five friends who met in college in late-1990s Taipei. The series narrates a love and friendship story that spans 16 years, from the summer of 1998 to 2014. It is set against major events that occurred in Taiwan during the 16 summers, such as the 729 blackout, 921 earthquake, SARS and the Financial crisis of 2007–08.

According to online statistics collected by the website dailyview.tw, it was the most popular Taiwanese idol dramas in 2014. Another website 7headlines.com ranked it the second most popular Taiwanese drama of 2014, after In a Good Way (which began broadcasting in 2013 and was therefore not included in dailyview.tw's ranking). Google ranked it the second most-searched TV series in Taiwan in 2014, after the Korean drama Empress Ki.

At the 50th Golden Bell Awards, the series won three out of seven nominations, including Best Television Series, Best Director, and Best Supporting Actress for Ann Hsu.

Synopsis
While in college, Jia-Ni Tang (Ruby Lin) falls in love with her schoolmate and neighbour, Wei-De Fang (Weber Yang), after she agrees with Wei-De's idea of an eye for an eye, when she catches her boyfriend cheating with another girl. However, broader events intervene in their romance: during the historic 1999 Jiji earthquake in Taiwan, Jia Ni's friend Jun-Jie Wang (Melvin Sia) becomes crippled in one leg. Out of obligation and compassion, Jia-Ni decides to marry Jun-Jie. When Jia Ni and Wei-De run into each other again in 2008, she is a married woman and he is about to walk down the aisle. They are still in love but part as friends. But when fate brings the two back together at another wedding in 2013, will they make the same decision?

Cast

Main cast
 Ruby Lin as Jia-Ni Tang
 Weber Yang as Wei-De Fang
 Jason Tsou as Guo-Qing Ding
 Ann Hsu as Rui-Rui Zheng
 Melvin Sia as Jun-Jie Wang

Supporting cast
 Queenie Tai as Ge Qing
 Ke Shu Qin as Linda
 Dylan Kuo as Jiang Da-wei (cameo) 
 Akio Chen as Wei-De's Father
 Lu Hsueh-Feng as Jia-Ni's Mother
 Lo Pei-An as Jia-Ni's Father
 Pang Yong Zhi as Tang Jia-Xing (Jia-Ni's brother)
 Albee Liu as  Jia-Ni's sister-in-law
 Tao Chuan-Cheng as Jun-Jie's Father
 He Ai Yun as Jun-Jie's Mother
 Chen Shi-Rong as Guo-Qing's Mother
 Gao Ting Yu as Xiao Yao (Jia-Ni's co-worker)
 Yu Jin as Ah Tai (Ding Guo-Qing's brother)
 Kelly Mi as Wei-De's Mother
 Lu Ying Rong as Xiao Mei
 Hank Wu as Jian Zhong
 Liu Sai Yang as Jiang Hua
 Lai Li Hua as Chen Li
 Yang Qing as Shu Ling
 Zhang Xi En as Luo Xiao Jun
 Shan Cheng-Ju as Jin Ge
 Renzo Liu as Liang Ge
 Yao Mi as Bao Bao
 Eric Chou as pop singer 
 Pauline Lan & TOLAKU as themselves (cameo)

Soundtrack
The Way We Were Original Soundtrack (16個夏天 電視原聲帶) was released on September 24, 2014 by various artists under Sony Music Entertainment (Taiwan) Ltd. It contains 15 songs, in which of them are instrumental versions of some songs. 

Eric Chou appears in ep.4, ep.10, ep.14 and ep.16 as a pop singer, performing his song live.

Pauline Lan and the band TOLAKU appear in ep.5 as themselves, performing their song on stage.

Production
TVBS launch of its own drama division in 2013, The Way We Were was announced to be the third drama being made by TVBS.

It began filming in Taipei, Taiwan, on 31 March 2014 and ended on 1 July 2014.  It reported more than 2 million NTD were spent on 2 days of filming in Shanghai.
It first aired in Taiwan on the Public Television Service and TVBS on 19 July 2014. And at same time, it aired in China by online video platform site iQIYI.

Special appearances
As her production, Lin invited good friends of her as cameo role or mentioned them by characters. Dylan Kuo guest stars in the earlier episodes, as he said "(I) have to be in Ruby Lin's drama." His character mentioned Peter Ho's name in ep.1 as an in-joke; Ho is a good friend of Kuo and Lin's in real life. In ep.3, Ruby Lin's character watched celebrity Alec Su on TV. It was another in-joke since Lin had been very good friends with Su since 1997, with the media over the years frequently asking them whether they were dating. Lin's own name as well as her claim-to-fame TV series My Fair Princess (1998-1999) are also mentioned in several episodes as in-jokes.

In addition, every episode begins with a short message from a celebrity friend of Lin's on the topic of "farewell", including Kevin Tsai (ep.1), Zhang Ziyi (ep.2), Mark Chao (ep.3), Peter Ho (ep.4), Vivian Hsu (ep.5), Jerry Yan (ep.6), Huang Xiaoming (ep.7), Tony Yang (ep.8), David Tao (ep.9), Patty Hou (ep.10), Huang Bo (ep.11), Shu Qi (ep.12), Cecilia Cheung (ep.13), Richie Jen (ep.14), Rainie Yang (ep.15), and Ethan Juan (ep.16).

DVD release
December 17, 2014: The Way We Were (DVD) (Taiwan Version) (16個夏天 (DVD)(台灣版)) - Public Television Service Foundation. (TW) - DVD Region 3 - 8 Dics (Ep.1-16)

Accolades 
Lan Zu-wei, chairman of the 50th Golden Bell Awards jury and film critic, said “The Way We Were” is an outstanding production on the strength of its complete storyline and high artistic and commercial values.
The series was praised for using character modeling, transformation of Taiwan's landscape and changes in characters' personalities to show 16 years of changes in the Taiwanese society.
“The Way We Were” selected as top ten 2015 Chinese-language TV series by Yazhou Zhoukan (Asia Weekly).

Broadcast
On 12 August, Taiwan Ministry of Foreign Affairs (MOFA) said The Way We Were is to be broadcast on 13 TV channels in Honduras, Guatemala, Panama, Nicaragua, El Salvador, Paraguay and the Dominican Republic — seven of Taiwan's 22 diplomatic allies — and in Argentina, Colombia and Mexico. It was chosen by the ministry following a strict screening process and will be the second Taiwanese TV series to be aired in Latin America.

References

External links
 PTS The Way We Were official site 
Official Facebook 
 TVBS Official site 
 Official Weibo 
 The Way We Were TVBS 經典頻道 

Taiwanese romance television series
Taiwanese drama television series
2014 Taiwanese television series debuts
2014 Taiwanese television series endings
TVBS original programming
Public Television Service original programming
Television shows written by Ryan Tu